Gerald L. Thompson (born November 25, 1923, Rolfe, Iowa; died November 9, 2009 Pittsburgh, Pennsylvania) was the IBM Professor of Systems and Operations Research (Emeritus) in the Tepper School of Business of Carnegie Mellon University.

By correspondence he obtained a Bachelor of Science degree from Iowa State University in 1944. After the war he attended Massachusetts Institute of Technology, graduating with Master of Science in 1948. He then took up further graduate study at University of Michigan, obtaining the Ph.D. in 1953 under the supervision of Robert M. Thrall.

In addition to being a mathematician, Thompson also was interested in painting. The illustration shown here is a study for "Chromatic Hamiltonian Knight's Tour". The painting combines Thompson's aesthetic and mathematical skills (the indicated moves of a knight on a chessboard cycle through the color wheel).

Thompson's students include Fred W. Glover.

Dartmouth College

From 1953 to 1958, Thompson taught at Dartmouth College in Hanover, New Hampshire, where he wrote Introduction to Finite Mathematics with John G. Kemeny and J. Laurie Snell. Introduction to Finite Mathematics was  "the first book which introduced mathematics into the study of management and business problems", according to Thompson's Carnegie-Mellon colleague, Professor Egon Balas. "Kemeny-Snell-Thompson" became a standard textbook in management science.

From 1958 to 1959, Thompson taught at Ohio Wesleyan University in Delaware, Ohio.

Carnegie Mellon University

In 1959, Thompson joined the faculty of the Graduate School of Industrial Administration at the Carnegie Institute of Technology in Pittsburgh, Pennsylvania.  At Carnegie Mellon University, Thompson became the IBM Professor of Systems and Operations Research and a Senior Researcher at the Innovation, Creativity, and Capital Institute.  He developed new methods for mathematical and computational modeling and expanded the use of mathematics in management science and economics.  His research encompassed mathematical programming, combinatorial optimization, production planning, large scale linear and network programming, computational economics, market games, optimal control theory, scheduling theory and practice, and management.

In 2001, Thompson  retired from Carnegie Mellon University at the age of seventy-eight. In 2003, a conference was held to honor Thompson's 80th birthday. At this conference, William W. Cooper gave an address on Thompson's work and impact on operations research; Cooper's address was published in the festschrift for Thompson.

Notable works
 
 
 
 

 
The column subtraction algorithm: An exact method for solving weighted set covering, packing and partitioning problems, Farid Harche, Gerald L. Thompson, Computers & OR 21(6): 689-705 (1994)

Awards
2004 class of Fellows of the Institute for Operations Research and the Management Sciences
The Chairman's Award for the Best Contributed Paper in Research, INFORMS Conference, Dallas, Texas - October 25–29, 1997
Western Electric Award for Innovative Teaching, American Assembly of Collegiate Schools of Business - 1976

References

Carnegie Mellon University faculty
20th-century American mathematicians
21st-century American mathematicians
Massachusetts Institute of Technology alumni
Iowa State University alumni
University of Michigan alumni
1923 births
2009 deaths
American operations researchers
Mathematical economists
American computer scientists
Fellows of the Institute for Operations Research and the Management Sciences
United States Navy personnel of World War II